Celsiella is a small genus of glass frogs endemic to Venezuela. It was established in 2009 and named in honour of Josefa Celsa Señaris, nicknamed "Celsi", a Venezuelan herpetologist who had worked with glass frogs.

Description
The ventral parietal peritoneum is white anteriorly and transparent posteriorly. The bones are pale green or green.

Male Celsiella call from, and females deposit their eggs on the underside or upper side of leaves. Tentative evidence suggests that males guard their eggs.

Taxonomy
Monophyly of Celsiella is strongly supported by genetic data. It is also morphologically distinct from the closely related genus Hyalinobatrachiumspecies of which have completely transparent venters, white liver, and white bones. It was erected in 2009; its species composition has not changed afterwards.

Species
There are two species:
 Celsiella revocata (Rivero, 1985)
 Celsiella vozmedianoi (Ayarzagüena and Señaris, 1997)

References

 
Glass frogs
Amphibian genera
Amphibians of South America
Endemic fauna of Venezuela
Taxa named by José Ayarzagüena
Taxa named by Santiago Castroviejo-Fisher